The Brothers of Our Lady Mother of Mercy, sometimes called the Brothers CMM or Brothers of Tilburg, is a Catholic lay religious congregation of Pontifical Right for men founded in Tilburg, the Netherlands, in 1844 by Johannes Zwijsen, and initially placed under the leadership of Franciscus Salesius de Beer (1821-1901). The purpose of the congregation was to  carry out works of charity and works of mercy. The congregation currently has about 300 members working in 10 countries. In June 2014, Brother Lawrence Obiko was elected as superior general of the congregation. Its members add the nominal letters C.M.M. after their names to indicate membership in the congregation.

References

Reading
Charles van Leeuwen, Bishop Zwijsen and his First Brothers. The Founder, the Founding Generation and the Foundation History (Valkhof Pers, Nijmegen, 2014). History of the Brothers of Our Lady Mother of Mercy, volume 1.
Charles van Leeuwen, Conscientious and Caring. Portrait of Father Superior De Beer, 1821-1901 (Valkhof Pers, Nijmegen, 2014). History of the Brothers of Our Lady Mother of Mercy, volume 2

External links

 Congregation Of The Brothers Of Our Lady, Mother Of Mercy, Tilburg in ODIS - Online Database for Intermediary Structures

1844 establishments in the Netherlands
Religious organizations established in 1844
Religious institutes in the Vincentian tradition
Catholic religious institutes established in the 19th century